The 1919 Massillon Tigers football season  was their last season in existence. The Tigers 1918 season was cancelled due to the outbreak of World War I and the Spanish flu pandemic. The team would be represented by Ralph Hay at the formation of the National Football League in 1920, however the league was unable to find a buyer for the Tigers.

The Tigers posted a 6–3–1 record in 1919.

Schedule

Game notes

References

Massillon Tigers seasons
Massillon Tigers
1919 in sports in Ohio